Wild Planet Trust, formerly known as the Whitley Wildlife Conservation Trust  (WWCT), is a registered charity, set up to run Paignton Zoo after the death of its founder, Herbert Whitley, who established the zoo on his estate at Primley, Paignton in Devon in the 1920s.

Wild Planet Trust also owns runs several local nature reserves in Devon, including Slapton Ley. Since 2003 it has owned and operated Newquay Zoo and Living Coasts. The Trust zoos have been recognised for sustainable tourism and was one of the first groups of British zoos to gain an ISO 14001 certificate for its environmental management systems.  along with a recent Gold award for GTBS Green Tourism Business Scheme for Newquay Zoo. All three of the Trust zoos works within the BIAZA, EAZA and WAZA zoo networks in Britain, Europe and the World as well as having ex-situ conservation links overseas.

The Wild Planet Trust Mission Statement, environmental and other policies are shared between all three sites and some can be viewed on the zoo websites. Recent Wild Planet Trust Annual Reviews are also available online.

Mission statement 
"Wild Planet Trust is an education, scientific and conservation charity dedicated to protecting our global wildlife heritage and inspiring in people a respect for animals, plants and the environment."

Strategic Aims 
 1. Education and engagement of the public on the conservation of the natural world.  
 2. In situ conservation of species and habitats. 
 3. Ex situ conservation of threatened species  
 4. Conservation advocacy: shaping behaviour-change for the benefit of biodiversity.

Read the full Strategic Plan here.

Education
Wild Planet Trust jointly developed the MSc/PgDip in Zoo Conservation with the University of Plymouth in 2004, with the aim of helping students to develop the understanding and skills required for a career in zoos and wildlife conservation. The trust also works closely with South Devon College in Paignton on their FdSC Animal Science and BSc Applied Animal Science programmes with their own classroom in the Education Centre at Paignton Zoo.

Wild Planet Trust also encourages and supports student research projects across its sites, and provides annual placement opportunities for students.

Research Projects
Ex situ conservation
 Development of a rapid diagnostic test for amphibian chytridiomycosis
 Provision of UV light in captive primates
 Model systems for the intensive management of highly threatened bird species
 Social management of captive primate populations
 Behaviour, nutrition and welfare of Ratites
 Husbandry and breeding in Vietnamese pheasants
 Implementation of animal training as a management tool
 Development of improved primate diets for health and welfare
 Effect of visitor experiences on animal behaviour and welfare
In situ conservation
 Conserving Hyper-endemic Udzungwa Restricted Amphibians
 Forest antelope surveys in Tanzania
 Camera-trap surveys for Aders' duiker in Kenya's coastal forests
 Ecology and genetics of rare, endemic whitebeam species
 Species recovery of strapwort, a Critically Endangered plant
 Bog hoverfly eDNA
Education and advocacy
 The education value of visitor feeding experiences
 Visitor research – behaviour and engagement
 Education evaluation toolkit

More information can be found here

Animals 
The Trust's zoos are the home of dozens of different species, from tiny poison dart frogs to towering giraffes. All of the animals live in natural-themed exhibits where they conserve their future and protect them from extinction.

Trustees 

Wild Planet Trust is governed by a Board of twelve trustees made up of a selection of professionals with skills and experience in science, commerce, the law and other relevant fields. The trustees are responsible for the oversight of the Trust's management and administration and ensure that the trust' conservation objectives are met.

History 
Herbert was born into a family of considerable means; his father, Edward Whitley, was the owner of a brewery empire and also the MP for Liverpool. Edward Whitley died in 1892 when Herbert was six and, like many children of well-to-do Victorian families, he was sent away to boarding school. In 1904, when Herbert was 18, Edwards's widow, Eleanor, moved her family south to Paignton, where they took over the Primley Estate.

Herbert's fascination with the living world began at an early age with the gift of a pair of canaries from his mother. His collection increased rapidly and it wasn't long before the outhouses and greenhouses of Primley were full of animals and plants. Herbert had a particular interest in the colour blue, and many of his early projects involved the breeding of animals and flowers that displayed his favourite colour. Herbert and his older brother William were well known locally as breeders of prizewinning livestock, although it was in 1910, with the arrival of his first monkeys, that the seeds were sown for what was to become Paignton Zoo.

In 1921, Herbert discovered that the coastal lagoon known as Slapton Ley, just 20 miles from Paignton, was under threat from development, and bought the land. This recognition of the importance of wild places (as well as wild life) underpins the work of our trust to this very day and highlights the essential role that conservation has played in our zoos from the outset.

Herbert also recognised the valuable role that zoos could play in education; in 1923, the Torbay Zoological Gardens opened its gates to the public. Entry was one shilling (5p) for adults and sixpence (2.5p) for children, and visitors could see a whole host of animals, from bears to monkeys, hyenas to birds. In 1924, a dispute over entertainment tax led to a brief closure of the fledgling zoo – Herbert believed that zoos were places of learning and not entertainment; and indeed education and engagement remains very much at the heart of our work today.

Herbert was held in high esteem by his peers and colleagues in the zoo world; Gerald Durrell (author, and founder of Jersey Zoo), Peter Scott of Slimbridge, and famed French aviculturist Jean Delacour were just three of his houseguests. His expertise, particularly with birds, was highly regarded and the developing zoo very quickly earned a name for itself in advancing husbandry and setting new standards.

In 1955, Whitley's health started to fail; he died on 15 September, aged 69. He chose his close friend of 20 years, Philip Michelmore, to be his successor. His Will made provision for a scientific and educational Trust to be established. The Herbert Whitley Trust was formed; in 1991 this became the Whitley Wildlife Conservation Trust.

In 1996 the zoo's name and logo was changed to Paignton Zoo Environmental Park. In 2003, the Trust built and opened Living Coasts, Torquay's coastal zoo and aquarium, and purchased Newquay Zoo in Cornwall, creating a family of conservation attractions.

The Whitley Wildlife Conservation Trust became Wild Planet Trust in 2019. The new name was chosen to reflect the charity's modern, inspiring and inclusive outlook.

Wild Planet Trust supports conservation in the United Kingdom and overseas using funds generated by the people who visit the zoos and the expertise and dedication of its staff. Conservation projects are coordinated by the Field Conservation and Research Department based at Paignton Zoo.

References

External links 

 
 Newquay Zoo Official site
  Paignton Zoo Official site
 Living Coasts Official site
Wild Planet Trust Facebook
Wild Planet Trust Twitter
Wild Planet Trust YouTube

Zoos in England
Organisations based in Cornwall
Tourist attractions in Cornwall
Organisations based in Devon
Tourist attractions in Devon
Charities based in Devon
Wildlife conservation organizations